Khlula is a Loloish language. It is spoken by the Phula people of China.

References

Loloish languages
Languages of China